Pseudophilotes is a Palearctic genus of butterflies in the family Lycaenidae.

Species
Pseudophilotes abencerragus (Pierret, 1837)
Pseudophilotes barbagiae De Prins & Poorten, 1982 Sardinia
Pseudophilotes baton (Bergstrasser, [1779])
Pseudophilotes bavius (Eversmann, 1832)
Pseudophilotes jordanicus (Benyamini, 2000) Jordan 
Pseudophilotes panope (Eversmann, 1851) Kazakhstan
Pseudophilotes panoptes (Hübner, [1813])
Pseudophilotes sinaicus Nakamura, 1975
Pseudophilotes vicrama (Moore, 1865)

References

Valentina Todisco, Andrea Grill, Konrad Fiedler, Brigitte Gottsberger, Vlad Dincă, Raluca Vodă,
Vladimir Lukhtanov and Harald Letsch (2018). Molecular phylogeny of the Palaearctic
butterfly genus Pseudophilotes
(Lepidoptera: Lycaenidae) with focus on
the Sardinian endemic P. barbagiae. BMC Zoology 3:4. https://doi.org/10.1186/s40850-018-0032-7

External links
Pseudophilotes at Markku Savela's Lepidoptera and some other life forms
images representing Pseudophilotes  at Consortium for the Barcode of Life

Polyommatini
Lycaenidae genera